Lačni Franz (meaning Hungry Franz) is a rock band from Slovenia that was also popular in the 1980s in Yugoslavia. While they were inspired by another Slovenian radical band Buldožer known for utilizing sheer madness in the social and political satire, their lyrics are more self-ironic. The band was formed in Maribor in June 1979. Their name, meaning Hungry Franz, is a pun on the name of a character from the novel Catch-22, Hungry Joe, and describes a hunger for rock music.

The band's music and attitude were in a sense laid back, and they portrayed themselves as a local band from a provincial town. Zoran Predin's lyrics ranged from disturbing ballads (Ne mi dihat za ovratnik, Lipa zelenela je), through love songs (Čakaj me, Naj ti poljub nariše ustnice), to social and political satire (Praslovan, Naša Lidija je pri vojakih).

The key band members were frontman and songwriter Zoran Predin, and guitarist Oto Rimele. The band had the most creative success towards the end of the 1980s, with classical albums such as Ikebana, Adijo pamet, Ne mi dihat za ovratnik, and Na svoji strani (the last one made with the original crew).  Their last studio album was released in 1994. Lačni Franz officially ceased to exist in 1997 after a series of compilation albums.

Zoran Predin continued a solo career after the Franz disbanded. Many of the band's hits, such as Praslovan, Bog nima telefona, Vaterpolist, Ne mi dihat za ovratnik, Čakaj me and Naj ti poljub nariše ustnice, have remained in his concert repertoire.

The band briefly regathered in the winter of 2005 - 2006, and held a series of concerts in Slovenia, Belgrade, and Zagreb.

Members
Current Members
 Zoran Predin, vocal
 Anej Kočevar, bass guitar
 Luka Čadež, drums
 Boštjan Artiček, keyboards
 Tine Čas, lead guitar

Past members
 Oto Rimele, lead guitar (1979–1985)
 Milan Prislan, lead guitar (1985-)
 Sašo Stojanovič, bass guitar (1979–1983)
 Zoran Stjepanovič, bass guitar
 Mirko Kosi, synthesizer
 Damjan Likavec, drums (1979–1982)
 Andrej Pintarič, drums
 Nino Mureškič, congas (1987–1989)
 Klemen Lombar, lead guitar (2014)

Discography

Albums
 Ikebana (1981)
 Adijo pamet (1982)
 Ne mi dihat za ovratnik (1983)
 Slišiš, školjka poje ti! (1983)
 Slon med porcelanom (1984)
 Na svoji strani (1986)
 Sirene tulijo (1987)
 Tiha voda (1989)
 Kaj bi mi brez nas (1989)
 Ilegalni pubertetniki (1991)
 Zadnja večerja (1994)
 Nasvidenje na plaži (1995)
 Petnajstletnica v živo (1995)
 Kaj bi mi brez nas (9 CD–box) (2000)
 Starši vaših radosti (CD+DVD) (2005)
 Ladja norcev (2016)
(All albums were issued by Helidon, except Petnajsletnica 1995 live album, which was a self-release and Ladja norcev, issued by Sedvex Records

External links

Zoran Predin's official site
Fan site
 Lačni Franz Videos

References

Slovenian new wave musical groups
Yugoslav rock music groups
Musical groups established in 1979
Musical groups disestablished in 1997